The 2014–15 South Florida Bulls men's basketball team represents the University of South Florida during the 2014–15 NCAA Division I men's basketball season. This was the 44th season of Basketball for USF, and the second as a member of the American Athletic Conference. The Bulls were coached by Orlando Antigua, who was in his first season. The Bulls play their home games at the USF Sun Dome. They finished the season 9–23, 3–15 in AAC play to finish in last place. They lost in the first round of the AAC tournament to UConn.

Previous season 
The Bulls finished the season 12–20, 3–15 in AAC play to finish in last place. They lost in the first round of the AAC tournament to Rutgers.

Departures

Incoming Transfers

Incoming recruits

Recruiting Class of 2015

Roster

Schedule and results

|-
!colspan=9 style="background:#006747; color:#CFC493;"| Exhibition

|-
!colspan=9 style="background:#006747; color:#CFC493;"| Non-conference regular season

|-
!colspan=9 style="background:#006747; color:#CFC493;"| Conference regular season

|-
!colspan=9 style="background:#006747; color:#CFC493;"| American Athletic Conference tournament

|-

References

South Florida Bulls men's basketball seasons
South Florida Bulls
South Florida Bulls men's b
South Florida Bulls men's b